The between-systems memory interference model describes the inhibition of non-hippocampal systems of memory during concurrent hippocampal activity. Specifically, Fraser Sparks, Hugo Lehmann, and Robert Sutherland found that when the hippocampus was inactive, non-hippocampal systems located elsewhere in the brain were found to consolidate memory in its place. However, when the hippocampus was reactivated, memory traces consolidated by non-hippocampal systems were not recalled, suggesting that the hippocampus interferes with long-term memory consolidation in other memory-related systems.

History 

The hippocampus (HPC) plays an important role in memory processes/functioning. It is a cortical structure in the anterior medial temporal lobe which is involved in the consolidation of short-term and long-term memories, specifically for memories of spatial navigation However, there are other cortical structures involved in memories which are referred to as non-HPC memory systems. The relationship between the HPC and non-HPC systems is often studied using fear conditioning, which is a form of learning where a noxious stimulus, such as an odour or shock, creates an emotional response of fear. The amygdala is often associated with these responses in fear conditioning in which conditioned stimuli can evoke emotional memories. Indirect measures of fear conditioning, such as freezing time, have been used to infer the functional levels of spatial and learning memory 
Researchers began believing other cortical structures, aside from the HPC, were involved in memory of contextual fear conditioning, because when the HPC was extensively damaged before fear conditioning, there was only a small effect on levels of behavioural memory assessments. It was deduced that other non-HPC memory systems must be involved in encoding, storing and retrieving memories during contextual fear conditioning, and that normally the HPC interferes with these processes. The mechanism of this interference is not entirely known, however studies have alluded to the location of this interference. Researchers have found that during fear conditioning the HPC competes with the non-HPC memory systems in the basolateral region of the amygdala. Injections of a dopamine D1 agonist SKF82958 into this area of the amygdala before a conditioning session were correlated with a decrease in the interference by the HPC, allowing non-HPC systems to form memories of the fear conditioning. Therefore, the increased dopamine to this area, inhibits amygdala functioning which includes the HPC interfering with memory encoding in non-HPC systems.

In studies of contextual fear conditioning, there are many views describing the interaction between HPC and non-HPC systems, or the transition of memories from being hippocampus dependent to independent. The HPC and non-HPC systems may acquire the same memories but if the HPC is intact, the non-HPC systems cannot independently form or retrieve these context memories. Therefore, the non-HPC systems appear to act like a back-up system for memories, that are only used when the main system, the HPC, is dysfunctional or absent. On the other hand, the HPC and non-HPC systems also have different functions. For example, the hippocampus is known to be important for context discrimination, while non-hippocampal systems have not shown evidence for this specific function 

One view for the transfer of memories from HPC-dependent to independent is that the strength of memories changes across the HPC and non-HPC systems, with damage to the HPC. In a study by Lehmann and colleagues (2009) adult male rats were put through contextual fear conditioning using feet shocks. If there was HPC damage and the rats experienced 11 sessions worth of shocks in one session, retrograde amnesia resulted. However, if there was damage in the HPC and shocks were applied over many conditioning sessions, then the memory for the contextual fear conditioning was not affected. So within the numerous conditioning sessions, the memory for contextual fear conditioning may have been formed by the non-HPC memory systems. Specifically memory representations in the non-HPC systems may be strengthened and eventually become independent of the HPC, which normally overshadows/interferes with the non-HPC systems in forming representations of memories in contextual fear conditioning. Conversely another view is that memories become independent of the HPC over time due to a reorganization of stored memories. Alternatively others believe memories change characteristics to become independent of the HPC, specifically in becoming less precise, more general and context free memories in non-HPC systems, assuming that the HPC is required for precise, detailed, contextual memories.

Procedure 

The procedure utilised in supporting the between-systems memory interference model was published under the title Between-systems memory interference during retrieval. Their paper explains how using the age-tested contextual fear conditioning paradigm allowed Fraser Sparks, Hugo Lehmann, and Robert Sutherland   to further investigate their model. They began by allowing their rat subjects to freely explore the conditioning chamber for three minutes, enabling them to become habituated. Afterwards, five 1 milliamp foot shocks lasting 2 seconds were administered with 60 seconds in between each shock. Retention of this memory was tested 11 days after the learning trials, where freezing behaviour was measured using FreezeFrame Video-Based Conditioned Fear System.

Using this paradigm, the rats were bilaterally injected with either muscimol or sterile physiological saline depending on if they were in the experimental or control condition respectively. These total hemispheric infusions were administered one hour before the conditioning trials, additionally immediately before the testing trials, allowing 30 minutes total between the end of infusion and behavioural conditioning or testing.

With this, the researchers were left with multiple experiments. In experiment 1A, the hippocampus of the rats were permanently damaged after the fear conditioning trial, while in experiment 1B, the hippocampus of the rats were lesioned before the fear conditioning trial. They found that rats receiving damage after conditioning demonstrated less freezing than control rats, whereas rats who received damaged before the conditioning trial did not differ in their freezing habits than the control rats. These results suggest that damage to the hippocampus causes retrograde, but not anterograde amnesia.

In this study specifically, they wanted to see if the hippocampus interfered with the retrieval of memory from non-hippocampal systems. Figure 1 outlines the procedures.

There were four total groups in this paradigm. First, the control group (Saline-Saline) were administered with saline right before the acquisition of the memory and again before the retention test. The second group (Muscimol-Muscimol) had muscimol administrations again just before acquisition and retention. Because muscimol treatments would cause inactivation both before the learning trial and at the time of testing, results showed that the freezing behaviours did not greatly differ from the control group. These observations allowed the researchers to infer that there is indeed a non-hippocampal system of memory at work when the hippocampus is inactivated. The third group (muscimol-Saline) was the most crucial to this study, as results demonstrated that muscimol injections immediately before acquisition and saline injections immediately before retention resulted in a significantly lower level of freezing in rats. These results would ultimately suggest that memory that was consolidated by non-hippocampal systems when the hippocampus was inactive was subsequently competing with the hippocampus once it was active again. Lastly, the fourth group (saline-muscimol) allowed the researchers to mimic the effects of post-training hippocampal lesions, where rats were administered with saline prior to acquisition and muscimol prior to retention.

Impact 

Studying between-systems interference could potentially provide further insight to understanding and treating amnesia. Specifically retrograde amnesia, where there is an inability to recall past memories, may be seen as the hippocampus interfering with the retrieval of memories from the non-hippocampal systems. If damage or inactivation of the HPC was induced and if the non-HPC systems were strengthened, perhaps these memories could be retrieved and recalled. However, before reaching this stage of application, more work needs to be done to understand the complexity of the non-HPC systems. This vein of research could potentially lead to more neuropsychological assessments to evaluate their functioning, just as there are tests for HPC functioning. Additionally, if memories can become independent of the HPC, maybe this effect is a two-way transformation pathway such that memories in contextual fear conditioning can become dependent on the HPC again.

One of the major implications that this model illustrates is the dominant effects of the hippocampus on non-hippocampal networks when information is incongruent. With this information in mind, future directions could lead towards the study of these non-hippocampal memory systems through hippocampal inactivation, further expanding the labile constructs of memory. Additionally, many theories of memory are holistically based around the hippocampus. This model could add beneficial information to hippocampal research and memory theories such as the multiple trace theory. Lastly, the between-system memory interference model allows researchers to evaluate their results on a multiple-systems model, suggesting that some effects may not be simply mediated by one portion of the brain.

References 

Memory